Basti buzdar is a town and union council of Dera Ghazi Khan District in the Punjab province of Pakistan. The town has population of about 5000-6000. It is named after the Buzdar tribe, who primarily inhabit the village.

History
Land of Basti Buzdar and it surrounding was property of Hasadi Chiefs of native town called Mangrotha.  According to verbal history the  neighbour tribe Qaisrani were involved in rivalry with the hasadi Chiefs. Due to this fear the chief decided to call Buzdar tribesmen to protect the land. This  decision lead to the foundation of Basti Buzdar. Historians are also of the view that the first person there was Noor Khan, so called to be the founder of Basti Buzdar. The hasadi Chiefs also awarded enough piece of land to Noor khan and his companions. Now in 2017 population is 8000-9000.

References

Populated places in Dera Ghazi Khan District
Union councils of Dera Ghazi Khan District
Cities and towns in Punjab, Pakistan